St. Olav's Hospital Trust is a health trust which covers Sør-Trøndelag, Norway. The trust is owned by Central Norway Regional Health Authority and is headquartered in Trondheim. As of 2011 it had 9,725 employees and an annual budget of 7.3 billion Norwegian krone.

The main facility is St. Olav's University Hospital, situated at Øya in Trondheim. The trust operates two other somatic facilities, Orkdal Hospital and Hysnes Rehabilitation Centre. In addition to the psychiatric clinic at St. Olav's, the trust operates two psychiatric hospitals, Østmarka Hospital and Brøset Hospital. It also operates district psychiatric centers in Nidaros, Orkdal and Tiller.

References

Health trusts of Norway
Companies based in Trondheim
2002 establishments in Norway
Hospitals established in 2002
Government agencies established in 2002